Drawdy Creek is a stream in the U.S. state of West Virginia.

Drawdy Creek most likely was named after William Drowdy, a pioneer county coroner.

See also
List of rivers of West Virginia

References

Rivers of Boone County, West Virginia
Rivers of West Virginia